Sueños Líquidos (Spanish for Liquid Dreams) is the fifth studio album (ninth overall) recorded by Mexican rock band Maná, It was released by WEA Latina on October 14, 1997 (see 1997 in music). After its release for the first time in over 36 countries across the globe, the band began to receive wide international attention, especially in Spain and the U.S., where the album sold over one million copies. This album was born of the desire to create an environment where water, a vital element, has an important presence. Because of this, the record was recorded in the coastal city of Puerto Vallarta, an important location in the creative atlas of Maná. Sueños Líquidos garnered Maná its first Grammy Award, for Best Latin Rock/Alternative Performance. The album was given a Premio Lo Nuestro award for "Pop Album of the Year" which was shared with Shakira for "¿Dónde están los ladrones?.
It was released on DVD-Audio format in 2001. As of 2000, it sold 5 millions of copies.

Track listing

After the final track, "Ámame Hasta Que Me Muera," there is a backmasked track. Those who found this early, won tickets to their shows.

Charts

Sales and certifications

Personnel
Fher Olvera – main vocals, electric guitar, acoustic guitar, harmonica, and group member
Alex González – drums, vocals, electric percussion, programming, and group member
Juan Diego Calleros – bass, acoustic bass and group member
Sergio Vallin – acoustic guitar, electric guitar, and group member

Guest performers
Juan Carlos Toribio – keyboards, programming
Luis Conte – percussion
Bob Tansen – flute on "Como Dueles En Los Labios"
José L. Quintana – background vocals
Randy Walman – keyboards, samples on "Como Dueles En Los Labios" and "La Sirena"
Pablo Aguirre – programming
Rick Bartist – trumpet
Doug Michael

See also
1997 in Latin music
List of number-one Billboard Top Latin Albums of 1997
 List of best-selling Latin albums
List of best-selling Latin albums in the United States

References

1997 albums
Maná albums
Warner Music Latina albums
Grammy Award for Best Latin Rock, Urban or Alternative Album
Spanish-language albums